The Pakistan men's national squash team represents Pakistan in international squash team competitions, and is governed by the Pakistan Squash Federation.

Since 1967, Pakistan has won 23 World Squash Team Open titles. Their most recent title came in 1992.

Current team
 Nourish Ahmahistan
 Farhan Zaman
 Danish Atlas Khan
 Tayyab Aslam
 Farhan Mehboob
 Hormahnah Tufmahnah

Results

World Team Squash Championships

Asian Squash Team Championships

See also 
 Pakistan Squash Federation
 World Team Squash Championships

References 

Squash teams
Men's national squash teams
Squash
Squash in Pakistan
Men's sport in Pakistan